Markham's frog  (Leiopelma markhami) is one of three extinct New Zealand frog species, the others being the Aurora frog (Leiopelma auroraensis) and Waitomo frog (Leiopelma waitomoensis). Subfossil bones used to describe the species were discovered at Honeycomb Hill Cave, South Island, New Zealand, but it once occurred on both South and North Islands. It is estimated that it grew between 50 and 60 mm from snout to vent and it appears to have been a very robust animal.

See also 
List of extinct animals of New Zealand
List of amphibians of New Zealand

References

Leiopelmatidae
Extinct animals of New Zealand
Amphibians of New Zealand
Holocene extinctions
Amphibians described in 1987
Extinct amphibians
Endemic amphibians of New Zealand